Petre Grosu (born 27 November 1955) is a Romanian former professional footballer who played as a midfielder or as a forward. He started his professional career at Sportul Studențesc, but he would have known full glory at Bihor Oradea being the top scorer of the team in the 1981–82 Divizia B season, also succeeding in promoting with Bihor Oradea. The best performance would come at the end of the 1982–83 Divizia A season when Grosu has become the top scorer of the Divizia A, the first and the last in the history of FC Bihor. With this performance, he secured a place in the Bihor Oradea hall of fame and a well-established place in the memory of supporters.

References

1955 births
Living people
Footballers from Bucharest
Romanian footballers
Association football midfielders
Association football forwards
Liga I players
Liga II players
FC Sportul Studențesc București players
FC Rapid București players
FC Bihor Oradea players
FC Petrolul Ploiești players
FC Drobeta-Turnu Severin players
Romanian football managers
CS ACU Arad managers
CS Național Sebiș managers